Moe Moe War (born 21 September 1984) is a Burmese former footballer who played as a defender. She has been a member of the Myanmar women's national team.

International career
Moe Moe War capped for Myanmar at senior level in three AFC Women's Asian Cup editions (2008, 2010 and 2014).

References

1984 births
Living people
Women's association football defenders
Burmese women's footballers
People from Mawlamyine
Myanmar women's international footballers